The Lion is a former public house on the corner of Barnet Road and Southgate Road in Potters Bar, Hertfordshire, England, and a grade II listed building with Historic England. It became Potty Pancakes some time after 2008.

References

External links

Grade II listed pubs in Hertfordshire
Restaurants in Hertfordshire
Potters Bar